Edith Méra (1905–1935) was an Austrian actress known for her roles in French films.

Selected filmography
 A Star Disappears (1932)
 Miche (1932)
 The Three Musketeers (1932)
 Dream Castle (1933)
 The Premature Father (1933)
 Mademoiselle Josette, My Woman (1933)
 Poliche (1934)
 The Midnight Prince (1934)

References

Bibliography 
 John T. Soister. Conrad Veidt on Screen: A Comprehensive Illustrated Filmography. McFarland, 2002.

External links 
 

People from Merano
1905 births
1935 deaths
Austrian film actresses
Austrian emigrants to France